Flag Pond is an unincorporated community in Unicoi County, Tennessee. It is part of the Johnson City Metropolitan Statistical Area, which is a component of the Johnson City–Kingsport–Bristol, TN-VA Combined Statistical Area – commonly known as the Appalachian Highlands region.

The community's name is believed to be derived from the presence of "flag flowers" (wild iris) growing in wet areas at the edge of a local pond.

Flag Pond is the location of a post office, assigned ZIP code 37657.

References

Unincorporated communities in Unicoi County, Tennessee
Unincorporated communities in Tennessee
Johnson City metropolitan area, Tennessee